Halesowen bus station is a bus station in the town of Halesowen in the West Midlands conurbation in England. It is owned and managed by Transport for West Midlands.

The station is located on Queensway in front of the Cornbow Centre, which houses the Asda superstore plus many other shops, and opposite Halesowen's Jobcentre Plus and Norman Church.

Originally, Halesowen had no bus station. Instead, most buses boarded adjacent to the old library building in Hagley Street/Great Cornbow, with the Service 130 (Birmingham-Stourbridge) boarding in New Road and Services 137/138 (Birmingham-Brierley Hill) at Shenstone island, some distance from the town. However, a new bus station opposite Church Croft in Queensway was constructed adjacent to the new shopping centre in the late 1960s, enabling Hagley Street to be pedestrianised. All bus services except Services 130/137/138 boarded here. However, these services were also relocated to the Bus Station from 1983 onward, following revisions to bus links into Birmingham.

The original bus station remain largely unchanged until part of the shopping centre frontage was sacrificed to enable it to be enlarged in 1999. However, it was soon clear that the station was outdated and it closed in March 2007 for a total redevelopment, which also saw a new Asda superstore opened nearby as part of a multimillion-pound regeneration of Halesowen town centre.

The present Bus Station was constructed on the same site and opened in December 2008, along with a new Asda supermarket in the Cornbow Shopping Centre towards the end of the previous month.

Whereas the original bus station permitted two-way arrival and departure along Queensway, with some stands located on a refuge on the far side from the shopping centre, all the departure stands in the present one are located on the same side as the Cornbow Centre. It features electronic departure doors that are automatically activated by arriving buses, thus permitting full passenger segregation from manoeuvring vehicles.

Bus routes

External links
 Network West Midlands

References
 

Bus stations in the West Midlands (county)
Halesowen